The following highways in Virginia have been known as State Route 50:
 State Route 50 (Virginia 1928-1933), now mostly State Route 2
 U.S. Route 50 (Virginia), 1926 - present

See also
1933 Virginia state highway renumbering